Agris Daņiļevičs (born October 26, 1963 in Sigulda) is a Latvian choreographer and dance teacher.

Biography
In 1985 he graduated from the Department of Culture and Art Sciences of the Latvian Conservatory .

In the 1980s, he worked in the folk dance ensemble "Gundega", initially as a tutor, later as an artistic director. In 1985 he became head of the Krimulda Parish dance group "Dzirnas", in 1998 - head of the dance school "Dzirnas". In 2002 he founded dance school "Dzirnas" in Riga.

His choreographies have been used at the Latvian Song and Dance Festival, the Latvian School Youth Song and Dance Festival , Expo 2000 and elsewhere. He has been a member of the jury of several TV shows, as well as participated in the TV3 Latvia show " 1 " ("Choir Wars") as a member of the Sigulda choir.

Awards and decorations
2011: Knight of the Order of the Three Stars
1998:  Award for the best motion direction of the year for the performance of the opera Alčīna

References

Further reading
Latvian encyclopedia . Volume 2. Riga: Valērija Belokoņa publishing house. 2003. 

1963 births
Living people
Latvian choreographers
Dance teachers
Latvian male dancers
Latvian Academy of Culture alumni